The following lists events that happened during 1973 in the Grand Duchy of Luxembourg.

Incumbents

Events

January – March
 9 January - The European Court of Justice building is opened in Kirchberg, Luxembourg City.

April – June
 4 April – Pierre Werner extends the operating concession to Compagnie Luxembourgeoise de Télédiffusion, now RTL Group, until 31 December 1995.
 7 April – Luxembourg City hosts the Eurovision Song Contest 1973 after Vicky Leandros' victory the previous year.  Representing Luxembourg, Anne-Marie David successfully defends Luxembourg's title, winning with the song Tu te reconnaîtras.
 20 June – Ernest Arendt is appointed to the Council of State.

July – September

October – December
 9 October – General strike held across Luxembourg.
 October – Cargolux purchases its first jet aircraft, a DC-8 Series 61.

Births
 29 January - Su-Mei Tse, musician, photographer, sculptor
 3 March – Xavier Bettel, politician
 14 November – Marc Meyers, musician

Deaths
 14 February – Émile Reuter, politician
 25 March – Edward Steichen, photographer
 30 March – William J. Kroll, metallurgist
 1 May – Jules Mersch, writer
 17 November – Lou Koster, composer

Footnotes

References